This article lists those who were potential candidates for the Democratic nomination for Vice President of the United States in the 1972 election. Coming into the 1972 Democratic National Convention, South Dakota Senator George McGovern had the delegate lead, but did not have the presidential nomination locked up. After winning the Democratic nomination for president on July 13, McGovern looked for a running mate. McGovern's first choice for vice president was Ted Kennedy, but Kennedy refused to join the ticket; Minnesota Senator Walter Mondale, Wisconsin Senator Gaylord Nelson, and Connecticut Senator Abraham A. Ribicoff also declined. McGovern offered the position to Missouri Senator Thomas Eagleton, who appealed to labor groups and Catholics, two groups that McGovern had alienated during the primary campaign. The ticket of McGovern and Eagleton was nominated by the 1972 Democratic National Convention. Following the convention, it was revealed that Eagleton had received treatment for depression in the 1960s. Though McGovern considered keeping Eagleton on the ticket, he ultimately chose to replace Eagleton with former ambassador Sargent Shriver. The McGovern–Shriver ticket lost the presidential election to the Nixon–Agnew ticket. After the controversy surrounding Eagleton, future campaigns spent much more time vetting vice presidential candidates.

Potential running mates
 Missouri Senator Thomas Eagleton (later withdrew)
 Former Ambassador Sargent Shriver
 Alaska Senator Mike Gravel
 Arkansas Governor Dale Bumpers
 Arkansas Representative Wilbur Mills
 Boston Mayor Kevin White
 CBS Evening News Anchorman Walter Cronkite
 Connecticut Senator Abraham A. Ribicoff
 Democratic National Committee Chair Larry O'Brien
 Florida Governor Reubin Askew
 Idaho Senator Frank Church
 Illinois Senator Adlai Stevenson III
 Indiana Senator Birch Bayh
 Maine Senator Edmund Muskie
 Former Massachusetts Governor Endicott Peabody
 Massachusetts Senator Ted Kennedy
 Michigan Representative James G. O'Hara
 Michigan Senator Philip Hart
 Minnesota Senator Walter Mondale
 New Jersey Representative Peter Rodino
 New Orleans Mayor Moon Landrieu
 Ohio Governor John J. Gilligan
 Texas State Representative Frances Farenthold
 United Auto Workers President Leonard Woodcock
 U.S. Civil Rights Commission head Father Theodore Hesburgh
 Wisconsin Governor Patrick Lucey
 Wisconsin Senator Gaylord Nelson

Frances Farenthold’s candidacy 
At the 1972 Democratic National Convention, there was a grassroots effort to nominate Frances Farenthold, a Texas state representative and unsuccessful candidate for the Democratic nomination for governor of Texas. She had gained recognition due to her surprising, though unsuccessful, forced run-off against Texas’ incumbent Democratic Governor Preston Smith and former state representative Dolph Briscoe, the favorite for the nomination and eventual winner, in the Democratic primaries.

The effort to nominate her for vice president came after the realization that Shirley Chisholm, the first major black candidate for President of the United States, would not have the delegates necessary to win the nomination at the convention. Chisholm had had the endorsement of and had helped found the National Women’s Political Caucus, a new organization formed in Washington, D.C. in 1971. Following her convention defeat, the caucus had moved to recruit Farenthold to run for the vice presidency. The individual chosen to place Francis “Sissy” Farenthold’s name in nomination for vice president would be Gloria Steinem, the co-founder of Ms. magazine.

Although the nomination effort aroused the convention-goers mired in malaise and anger from the difficult 1972 Democratic National Convention, the campaign for her vice presidency was highly disorganized and last-minute, without a serious chance at denying Senator Thomas Eagleton his nomination by George McGovern. Despite coming from the state of Texas, the Texas delegation, controlled by Dolph Briscoe, did not support her candidacy. Regardless, the balloting for vice president finished with Farenthold receiving 405 delegates, and 13.73% of the vote, the second-most of all of the candidates.

Farenthold was the first serious female candidate for the nomination for vice president of the United States by either major party. She would go on to once again compete with and lose to Dolph Briscoe for the Democratic nomination for governor of Texas in 1974.

See also
 1972 Democratic National Convention
 1972 Democratic Party presidential primaries

References

Vice presidency of the United States
1972 United States presidential election
Ted Kennedy
Walter Mondale